The Le Piaf was a French automobile manufactured from 1951 to 1952.  Only a few cars, powered by a 175 cc two-stroke engine, were built at the factory in Livry-Gargan.

References
David Burgess Wise, The New Illustrated Encyclopedia of Automobiles.

External links 
 Allcarindex 
 Autopasion18 (Spanish)

Piaf, Le